Kolja or Colja is a short form of the given name Nikolai. It may refer to:

 Kolya (Czech: Kolja), a 1996 Czech drama film
 Kolja Afriyie (born 1982), German former professional football player
 Kolja Blacher (born 1963), German violin player
 Kolja Pusch (born 1993), German footballer
 Kolja Schallenberg (born 1984), German director and play writer
 Alojz Colja (born 1943), Slovenian rower
 Nikola Pejaković, Serbian actor, theater director and musician, nicknamed Kolja.

See also
 Kolya (disambiguation)